The Cold Room is a 1984 cable television film by James Dearden.

Based on an eponymous 1978 science fiction novel by Jeffrey Caine, the film stars George Segal, Amanda Pays (in her film debut), Anthony Higgins, Renée Soutendijk, and Warren Clarke. The original film score is by Michael Nyman. It was a production of MCEG/Sterling Entertainment and released on VHS by Charter Entertainment.

Plot
Carla Martin (Amanda Pays) is leaving an English parochial boarding school for the summer to live with her estranged father at an inn in East Berlin. The headmistress (Ursula Howells), a nun, gives her a 1936 guide to Berlin, telling Carla that she may find it useful, even though Berlin has surely changed as much as she has. Her best friend, Sophie (Lucy Hornack), gives her a bag of marijuana.

Hugh Martin (George Segal), her father, who lives on Central Park West, greets her at the Berlin Airport, surprised at how grown she looks. Carla is a bit embarrassed that he has given her a teddy bear, as she is nearly seventeen years old. She addresses him on a first name basis, and a camera pan reveals that he just bought the teddy bear at the airport. As they cross through the Berlin Wall, Carla is terrified that she will be personally searched and caught with drugs.

Hugh has a thirty-year-old girlfriend named Lili (Renée Soutendijk), who recommends Frau Hoffman's (Elizabeth Spriggs) inn because of the local character being significant to Hugh's historical research. Carla is convinced that there are rats behind the wall and wants to leave. Hugh has Frau Hoffman humor her and show her that there is merely a broom closet next door, though that room is not deep enough to convince her. Hugh insists it's probably just part of the next room.

Carla sees flashes of another girl in the wardrobe mirror, starts tapping the wall behind it and gets taps back, and tearing away at the wallpaper, she opens the wall to find a disused cold room, for the hotel was once a butcher's shop and home, and a Jewish dissident named Erich (Anthony Higgins) hiding inside. She begins sneaking him food from the hotel kitchen, along with utensils and her father's razor, to help him. Carla is experiencing two realities, one in the 1980s when she is Carla Martin and another in 1936, when she is Christa Bruckner. Christa is the daughter of butcher Wilhelm Bruckner (Warren Clarke), a member of the Nazi Party who calls her a "little slut" and rapes her in the night. Christa also has lines of cuts in both of her palms. Carla is ashamed by the rape and scrubs herself thoroughly in the bathtub.

Hugh is concerned that Carla may be going insane like her mother did and finally makes good on his insistence at having her seen by a doctor (George Pravda). When the doctor comes, she has stripped the sheets on her bed for their dirtiness and is not wearing anything under the bed covers, so her father steps out for the examination. The doctor cannot find anything wrong, and when she tells him that her father raped her the night before and asks him to examine her, he sees only inflammation from the scrub brush and identifies her as virgo intacta—she was not raped.

Christa and Erich begin lovemaking, as Christa fears she is pregnant by her father and psychologically needs to have the possibility that any baby born is Erich's. She carves their names into a cross centered on the letter I on the wall of the cold room. Soon after, Hugh finds her huddled in a nightgown inside the wardrobe, which is filled with rotten food. Hugh and Lili get her dressed and take her out of the hotel. As they are getting into the car, Herr Bruckner drags her back into the butcher shop and insists he needs her for deliveries. In reality, this is to give Frau Hoffman time to reveal Erich to the Gestapo. When they return, Moltke (Clifford Rose), who had previously interrogated her about a visit to a Jewish man referred to her by Erich (something Carla was not able to accomplish in her own experience), is waiting in her bedroom. Erich shot one of Moltke's men, and Moltke killed him.

Hugh and Lili carry Carla back to the room with Frau Hoffman's assistance. When Carla regains consciousness, she begins accusing Frau Hoffman of having killed Erich. Not being able to tell Hugh from Herr Bruckner, she stabs him in the chest near the shoulder with a knife she has hidden. Coming to her senses, she and Lili ride with him in the ambulance.

Hugh now with his arm in a sling, the police are called to open the wall behind the wardrobe, which Carla had never actually opened. The planks Herr Bruckner had sealed it up with are removed, and Carla investigates it, filled with rats as she initially suspected, discovering the place where Christa and Erich's names are carved into the wall. Frau Hoffman is unable to hide her shame. Hugh takes Carla back to the airport to live with her aunt, with whom she lived prior to boarding school.

Soundtrack album

The original music for the film was performed by the Wembley Studio Chamber Orchestra and recorded at The Music Centre, CTS Studios, London.

Track listing
Main Theme
The Nightmare Begins
The Closet
Sorcerer
Sounds of the Night
Her Man Awaits
Ghosts of the Past
The Damned
Thoughtful
Spectral Moments
Macabre Piano
A Cold Spot
Red Drum
Chase
The Nightmare Ends
Main Theme – Reprise

Personnel
Music composed, arranged, and produced by Michael Nyman
Performed by the Wembley Studio Chamber Orchestra
Recorded at The Music Centre, CTS Studios, London
Recording Engineer: Pete Wandless
Assistant: Keith Bourdice

References

External links

1980s science fiction films
1984 films
1984 television films
1995 soundtrack albums
1980s mystery films
British mystery films
British science fiction films
Films about Nazi Germany
Films based on British novels
Films directed by James Dearden
Films set in 1936
Films set in Berlin
Films set in East Germany
1980s psychological horror films
Television soundtracks
Films about time travel
Films scored by Michael Nyman
Incest in film
Films about rape
1980s English-language films
1980s British films